Lactarius rubrilacteus is a species of mushroom of the genus Lactarius. It is also known as the bleeding milkcap, as is at least one other member of the genus, Lactarius deliciosus.

Description
The mushroom can have either a bluish green or an orangy brown hue, with creamy white or yellow spores that are ellipsoid in shape. Greenish colors are more common to old, damaged or unexpanded specimens. The cap also has quite an underfolded margin and a depressive disk.

Lactarius rubrilacteus has many laticifers which appear as a white network across the surface of the mushroom. When sliced or cut, the mushroom flesh will typically release a dark red to purple latex or milky substance. The flesh itself will lose colour when damaged, and is usually granular or brittle to the touch. The stem is quite thin, being only several centimetres in any dimension, and is of an average size and shape for a mushroom. The fungus itself exudes a slight odour that is faintly aromatic. This mushroom is edible. Commonly found with a small blue or green mushroom attached at the base. Bruises green.

Similar species 
Lactarius deliciosus is a related species, but its cap differs in appearance. L. sanguifluus is also similar.

Distribution and habitat
The mushroom is primarily found in parts of western North America, growing in forests and on the ground. The mushroom usually finds cover under conifer trees, mainly Douglas fir. It is widely distributed in these areas between the months of June and October.

Chemical reactivity
Potassium hydroxide: When the mushroom comes in contact with potassium hydroxide, most of the mushroom, including the mantle and ectomycorrhizae, loses its bluish hue and becomes a dull brown.
Melzer's reagent: Hardly any visible reaction on any part of the mushroom occurs. This particular mushroom appears to have little reactivity to Melzer's Reagent.
Sulfovanillin: Most of the mushroom becomes a reddish-brown color, but the oldest roots of the fungi stay unaltered by contact with sulfovanillin.

See also
List of Lactarius species

References

rubrilacteus
Fungi described in 1979
Fungi of North America
Edible fungi
Taxa named by Alexander H. Smith